Richard Pateman Wallis (July 30, 1867 – October 14, 1918) was a Canadian politician. He served in the Legislative Assembly of British Columbia from January to October 1918 for the electoral district of Alberni, a member of the Conservative party.  He died in office of pneumonia.

References

1867 births
1918 deaths